Oman national under-23 football team (also known as Oman Olympic, Oman U-23) represents Oman in international football competitions in the Olympic Games. The selection is limited to players under the age of 23 but the final tournament at the Olympics allows for the addition of up to three overage players. The team is controlled by the Oman Football Association.

Oman nearly made its first appearance in football at the Summer Olympics after earning an inter-confederation play-off match with Senegal for a chance qualify for the 2012 Olympics but a 0-2 loss eliminated them from the contention.

Schedule

Recent and forthcoming matches

Players

Current squad
 The following players were called up for the 2022 WAFF U-23 Championship.
 Match date: 3 – 15 November 2022

Previous squads

Asian Games
Football at the 2006 Asian Games squads – Oman
Football at the 2010 Asian Games squads – Oman
Football at the 2014 Asian Games squads – Oman

AFC U-23 Championship
2013 AFC U-22 Championship squads – Oman
2018 AFC U-23 Championship squads – Oman

Personnel

Current technical staff

Competitive Record

Asian Games

Olympic Games
{| align=border width=40% border=1 cellpadding="2" cellspacing="0" style="background: #f9f9f9; border: 1px #aaa solid; border-collapse: collapse; font-size: 80%; text-align: center;"
|- align=center bgcolor=red style="color:white"
!Host nation / Year
!Result
!GP
!W
!D*
!L
!GS
!GA
|-
| 1896||colspan="7"|No football tournament was held 
|-
| 1900||colspan="7" rowspan="7"|Did not enter
|-
| 1904
|-
| 1908
|-
| 1912
|-
| 1920
|-
| 1924
|-
| 1928
|-
| 1932||colspan="7"|No football tournament was held 
|-
| 1936||colspan="7" rowspan="11"|Did not enter
|-
| 1948
|-
| 1952
|-
| 1956
|-
| 1960
|-
| 1964
|-
| 1968
|-
| 1972
|-
| 1976
|-
| 1980
|-
| 1984
|-
| 1988||colspan="8" rowspan="8"|Did not qualify
|-
| 1992
|-
| 1996
|-
| 2000
|-
| 2004
|-
| 2008
|-
| 2012
|-
| 2016
|-
!Total ||0/25||0||0||0||0||0||0
|}*Denotes draws including knockout matches decided on penalty kicks.''

AFC U-23 Championship record

See also
Oman national football team
Oman national under-20 football team
Oman national under-17 football team

External links
 Official website

References

Asian national under-23 association football teams
under-23